Birboneh or Bir Boneh or Bir Benah may refer to:
 Birboneh-ye Bala
 Birboneh-ye Pain